Exit Glacier is a glacier derived from the Harding Icefield in the Kenai Mountains of Alaska and one of Kenai Fjords National Park's major attractions. It is one of the most accessible valley glaciers in Alaska and is a visible indicator of glacial recession due to climate change.

It received its name for serving as the exit for the first recorded crossing of the Harding Icefield in 1968.

History 

In the spring of 1968, the first documented mountaineering party succeeded in crossing the Harding Icefield. Ten people were involved in the crossing, which went from Chernof Glacier east to Resurrection Glacier (Later renamed Exit as the newspaper reported that the group would be descending the "Exit Glacier"). Expedition members included Bill Babcock, Eric Barnes, Bill Fox, Dave Johnston, Yule Kilcher and his son Otto, Dave Spencer, Helmut Tschaffert, and Vin and Grace (Jansen) Hoeman. As noted above, Yule Kilcher, Dave Johnston, Vin Hoeman, and Grace Hoeman were veterans of previous attempts; of the ten, only four–Bill Babcock, Dave Johnston, Yule Kilcher, and Vin Hoeman–hiked all the way across the icefield. The expedition left Homer on April 17, bound for Chernof Glacier; eight days later, they descended Exit Glacier and arrived in Seward. Along the way, the party made a first-ever ascent of Truuli Peak, a  eminence that protrudes from the northwestern edge of the icefield near Truuli Glacier.

Exit Glacier was one of the major landmarks that President Barack Obama visited during his historic trip to Alaska in 2015. The rapid retreat of the glacier highlights the effects of climate change and how it affects Alaska's coastal glaciers.

Access 
The Exit Glacier is especially notable for being a drive up glacier (similar to the Mendenhall Glacier of Juneau). A spur road off the Seward Highway leads to the only road accessible portion of the Kenai Fjords National Park.  A system of hiking trails lead to the terminus of the glacier and up to the Harding Icefield itself. Although it is one of the Harding Icefield's smaller glaciers, it is one of the most visited because of its easy accessibility and abundant hiking trails around and above the glacier. Exit Glacier is accessible year-round.  Upon the arrival of snow, usually in mid-November, the road is closed to cars but open to a wide range of winter recreation:  from snow machines, dogsleds, fat-tire bicycles, and cross-country skiers.

Ranger programs 

Ranger-led walks to Exit Glacier are available at 10 am, 11 am, 1 pm, and 2 pm daily during the summer season. These walks are approximately 1–2 hours long. "Ranger Talks" are held in the Exit Glacier Pavilion at 12:30 pm. These last approximately 20–30 minutes. A guided hike to Marmot Meadows along the Harding Icefield trail is also available every day of the summer season at 9 am and lasts 3 to 4 hours.

Wildlife 
 American black bear
 Hoary marmot
 Mountain goat
 Western screech owl
 Great horned owl
 Boreal owl
 Northern saw-whet owl
 Steller's jay
 Black-billed magpie
 Horned lark
 Violet-green swallow
 Warblers
 Snow bunting
 Ice worms

See also 
 List of glaciers and icefields
 Exit Glacier, Kenai Fjords National Park Project Jukebox

References

External links 

 Exit Glacier Area National Park Service site
 Hourly weather forecast from Anchorage office of National Weather Service

Glaciers of Alaska
Glaciers of Kenai Peninsula Borough, Alaska
Kenai Fjords National Park